The 2012 Grand Prix Hassan II was a professional men's tennis tournament played on outdoor clay courts. It was the 28th edition of the tournament which was part of the ATP World Tour 250 category 2012 ATP World Tour. It took place in Casablanca, Morocco between 9 April and 15 April 2012. Pablo Andújar won the singles title.

Singles main-draw entrants

Seeds

 1 Rankings are as of April 2, 2012

Other entrants
The following players received wildcards into the singles main draw:
  Alexandr Dolgopolov
  Yassine Idmbarek
  Mehdi Ziadi

The following players received entry from the qualifying draw:
  Roberto Bautista Agut
  Federico Delbonis
  Sergio Gutiérrez Ferrol
  Lamine Ouahab

Withdrawals
  Łukasz Kubot

Retirements
  Malek Jaziri (dizziness)

Doubles main-draw entrants

Seeds

 Rankings are as of April 2, 2012

Other entrants
The following pairs received wildcards into the doubles main draw:
  Anas Fattar /  Younès Rachidi
  Mohamed Saber /  Mehdi Ziadi

Champions

Singles

 Pablo Andújar defeated  Albert Ramos 6–1, 7–6(7–5)
 It was Andújar's 2nd career title and the 2nd in Casablanca.

Doubles

 Dustin Brown /  Paul Hanley defeated  Daniele Bracciali /  Fabio Fognini, 7–5, 6–3

External links
 Official website
 ITF tournament edition details
 ATP official site